Faule is a comune (municipality) in the Province of Cuneo in the Italian region Piedmont, located about  southwest of Turin and about  north of Cuneo, near the Po River. 
The city is famous for the piedmontais traditional food "Bagna Cauda"

It is home to a 10th-century castle and to several medieval buildings.

Twin towns — sister cities
Faule is twinned with:

  Humberto Primo, Argentina (1997)

References

External links
 www.comune.faule.cn.it

Cities and towns in Piedmont